The Meddlin' Stranger is a lost 1927 American silent Western film directed by Richard Thorpe and featuring Boris Karloff.

Cast
 Wally Wales as Wally Fraser
 Nola Luxford as Mildred Crawford
 Charles K. French as Her Father
 Mabel Van Buren as Her Mother
 James A. Marcus as 'Big Bill' Dawson (as James Marcus)
 Boris Karloff as Al Meggs

See also
 Boris Karloff filmography

References

External links
 
 

1927 films
1927 Western (genre) films
1927 lost films
American black-and-white films
Lost Western (genre) films
Films directed by Richard Thorpe
Lost American films
Pathé Exchange films
Silent American Western (genre) films
1920s American films